Harrie Herbert 'Harry' Forbes (1914-1995) was an Australian rugby league footballer who played in the 1930s and 1940s. He later became an administrator.

Harry 'Akka' Forbes was a legendary figure at North Sydney, initially as a player, then a coach and later the Secretary of the club for over 30 years.

Playing career
Forbes played five seasons in first grade with North Sydney between 1934 and 1939. He retired from playing after captaining Norths reserve grade team to the premiership in 1940.

Coaching career
Forbes immediately began coaching at the club, winning the reserve grade premiership again in 1942, and became first grade coach in 1946. Forbes was also instrumental in procuring Frank Hyde to Norths in 1943. He later began a thirty-year association with Norths as Club Secretary, retiring in the 1980s. Forbes was voted the premiership's most popular player by the Daily Mirror Newspaper in 1939.

Harry 'Akka' Forbes died on 19 April 1995, aged 81.

References

1914 births
1995 deaths
Australian rugby league players
Australian rugby league coaches
Australian rugby league administrators
North Sydney Bears coaches
North Sydney Bears players